Yang Xiaojun (born May 18, 1963) is a Chinese volleyball player who competed in the 1984 Summer Olympics and in the 1988 Summer Olympics.

In 1984, she was a member of the Chinese volleyball team which won the gold medal. She played all five matches.

Four years later, in 1988, she was part of the Chinese team which won the bronze medal.
She was head coach of the female volleyball team 1. VC Wiesbaden in Germany. She was dismissed 2011.
She has one daughter.

Awards

National team
 1984 Los Angeles Olympic Games -  Gold Medal
 1985 World Cup -  Gold Medal
 1986 World Championship -  Gold Medal

External links
 profile

1963 births
Living people
Chinese women's volleyball players
Olympic bronze medalists for China
Olympic gold medalists for China
Olympic volleyball players of China
Volleyball players at the 1984 Summer Olympics
Volleyball players at the 1988 Summer Olympics
Volleyball players from Beijing
Olympic medalists in volleyball
Asian Games medalists in volleyball
Volleyball players at the 1986 Asian Games
Medalists at the 1988 Summer Olympics
Medalists at the 1984 Summer Olympics
Medalists at the 1986 Asian Games
Asian Games gold medalists for China
20th-century Chinese women